Rudbar Lorestan Dam is a hydroelectric dam on the Rudbar River, a tributary of the Dez River, in Iran's Lorestan Province with an installed electricity generating capability of 450 MW. It was scheduled to become operational in 2013. Finally, the dam was completed on September 15, 2016. The hydroelectric plant consisting of two 225-MW vertical Francis turbine-generator units has begun operating on May 31, 2017.

See also

List of power stations in Iran

References

Hydroelectric power stations in Iran
Dams in Lorestan Province
Gravity dams
Roller-compacted concrete dams
Dams in the Tigris–Euphrates river system
Buildings and structures in Lorestan Province